Lisy  is a village in the administrative district of Gmina Brąszewice, within Sieradz County, Łódź Voivodeship, in middle Poland.

References 

 Piotr Tameczka, Wsie regionu sieradzkiego (Villages in Sieradz County): "Lisy." Entry in Geographical Dictionary of Poland and at the 1925 Polish census. Retrieved May 9, 2013.

Villages in Sieradz County